Rumble: The Indians Who Rocked The World is a Canadian documentary film directed by Catherine Bainbridge and co-directed by Alfonso Maiorana, released in 2017. The film profiles the impact of Indigenous musicians in Canada and the US on the development of rock music. Artists profiled include Charley Patton, Mildred Bailey, Link Wray, Jesse Ed Davis, Stevie Salas, Buffy Sainte-Marie, Robbie Robertson, Randy Castillo, Jimi Hendrix, Taboo and others. The title of the film is a reference to the pioneering instrumental "Rumble", released in 1958 by the American group Link Wray & His Ray Men. The instrumental piece was very influential on many artists.

The idea for the film came from Stevie Salas (Apache) and Tim Johnson (Mohawk), two of the film's executive producers. They created an exhibit for the Smithsonian National Museum of the American Indian about the indigenous influence on American music, titled “Up Where We Belong: Native Musicians in Popular Culture”.

The film features many influential musicians who discuss the musical contributions of indigenous artists, including commentaries from Quincy Jones, George Clinton, Taj Mahal, Martin Scorsese, John Trudell, Steven Tyler, Marky Ramone, Slash, Iggy Pop, Buddy Guy, Steven Van Zandt, Taylor Hawkins, Robert Trujillo, and others.

The film premiered at the 2017 Sundance Film Festival.

The film was released on home entertainment (DVD) on December 19, 2018 via Kino Lorber. It had its broadcast premiere on PBS as part of Independent Lens on January 21, 2019.

Awards
At Sundance, the film won the World Cinema Documentary Special Jury Award for Masterful Storytelling. The film won Best Music Documentary at the 2017 Boulder International Film Festival.

At the Hot Docs Canadian International Documentary Festival, the film won both of the Audience Award categories.

In December, the Toronto International Film Festival named the film to its annual Canada's Top Ten list of the ten best Canadian films.

The film won three Canadian Screen Awards at the 6th Canadian Screen Awards in 2018, for Best Feature Length Documentary, Best Editing in a Documentary (Jeremiah Hayes and Benjamin Duffield) and Best Cinematography in a Documentary (Maiorana).

References

External links

2017 films
Canadian documentary films
Documentary films about First Nations
Documentary films about Native Americans
Documentary films about rock music and musicians
Rezolution Pictures films
Best Documentary Film Genie and Canadian Screen Award winners
2010s English-language films
2010s Canadian films